Renato Bruson (born 13 January 1936) is an Italian operatic baritone. Bruson is widely considered one of the most important Verdi baritones of the late 20th and early 21st century. He was born in Granze near Padua, Italy.

Biography and career
Bruson's passion for music matured in the parish choir when he was a child. He began his music studies at the conservatory of Padua where he was awarded a scholarship that allowed him to attend the courses in the face of economic problems. He did not receive much support from his family, who considered him a good-for-nothing. In his own words: "They thought that I only wanted to study music because I had no desire to work. At that time, the general feeling where I lived was that if someone worked, they had a future, whereas those who studied, especially if they studied music, were considered failures who would never find their path in life." However, he could continue his studies with the help of the administration of the conservatory and the support of friends.

Bruson made his operatic debut as the Conte di Luna in Il trovatore at the Teatro Lirico Sperimentale in Spoleto in 1960. The following year he was Riccardo in I puritani at the Teatro dell'Opera di Roma in Rome. His first Metropolitan Opera appearance was as Enrico in Lucia di Lammermoor in 1969. In 1970 he started his collaboration with conductor Riccardo Muti in Un ballo in maschera in Florence. He made his debut at La Scala in 1972 as Antonio in Donizetti's Linda di Chamonix, at the Edinburgh International Festival in 1972 as Ezio in Attila, at Covent Garden in 1975 in the role of Renato in Un ballo in maschera, substituting with great success for Piero Cappuccilli. He debuted at the Vienna State Opera in 1978 with Macbeth, with such a success that the prestigious Austrian theatre awarded him with the important title of Kammersänger. In the 1980s he turned to the 18th century with Mozart's Don Giovanni and to Italian verismo with Umberto Giordano's Andrea Chénier.

He is considered by some critics the finest Rigoletto since Tito Gobbi. They appreciate his elegant and expressive phrasing, velvety tone, musical intelligence and acting qualities. He excels in long, lyrical lines. He is also appreciated for not disdaining smaller roles and for not assuming a diva attitude. Bruson once described himself in the following terms: "I am self critic enough to understand what I can get at. Since I knew I did not have a thundering voice to make coarse effects, I sought the interpretation since I think it is more important that the public go home with something in their hearts than some sounds in their ears".

He can be seen on commercial DVD in the role of Macbeth in a performance from the Deutsche Oper with Mara Zampieri and James Morris.

Videography
 The Metropolitan Opera Centennial Gala, Deutsche Grammophon DVD, 00440-073-4538, 2009

Acknowledgements
Carlo Maria Giulini: "I believe Renato Bruson now is the Falstaff. He has the wit, the intelligence, the dignity and, of course, the voice. Basta."
Giuseppe Sinopoli: "Only the baritone Renato Bruson has a similar ability [to Mirella Freni) to make expression and word coincide, he explores it with all the semantic charge it contains. And this is not the result of an intellectual activity but is a privileged instinct".
Music critic Christian Springer wrote of Bruson: "Bruson was the quintessential Verdi baritone in the second half of the last century. A Verdi baritone not as it was understood (or rather, misunderstood) in the 1950s and 1960s, but a Verdi baritone as understood and desired by the composer himself."

Honors and awards
Bruson has received numerous honors, including:
Honorary citizenship of Fermo
Doctor Honoris Causa by the University of Urbino
Honorary citizenship of Parma
Honorary citizenship of Ortona (birth city of Francesco Paolo Tosti, of whom he performed many works)
Honorary citizenship of Palmi (birth city of Francesco Cilea)
Honorary membership of the "Donizetti Society" of London
Cavaliere di Gran Croce of the Italian Republic
Commendation of the Sovereign Military Order of Malta
Kammersänger awarded by the Wiener Staatsoper

He received the Orphée d'or by the French Académie du disque Lyrique in 1980 for the Luisa Miller on Deutsche Grammophon.

Notes

References
Tita Tegano – Renato Bruson: 40 anni di "Recitar cantando" (40 Years of Acting by Singing) – Pantheon, 2001, 
Tita Tegano – Renato Bruson: L'interprete e i personaggi – Azzali Editore, 1998

External links

Discography
[ Biography]
Video of the final rehearsal of La Traviata with Renato Bruson as Giorgio Germont in the online-archive of the Österreichische Mediathek 

Italian operatic baritones
1936 births
Living people
Österreichischer Kammersänger
20th-century Italian  male opera singers
People from the Province of Padua